The List of Kuruluş: Osman characters lists the characters appearing in Kuruluş: Osman, a Turkish TV series created by Mehmet Bozdağ. It focused on the life of Osman I, founder of the Ottoman Empire. Osman is portrayed by Burak Özçivit.

Many of the characters are based on people related to Osman I, including Rabia Bala Hatun, Sheikh Edebali, Ertuğrul and Malhun Hatun along with fictional characters adapted from the Book of Dede Korkut, such as Selcan Hatun and Bamsı Beyrek.

Every season saw additions to the cast. In the first season, Alma Terzić  and Eren Vurdem joined the cast. In season 2, Erkan Avcı and Kanbolat Görkem Arslan were credited. In season 3 Serhat Kiliç played Tekfur Michael Kosses, a relative of the emperor, Tekfur of Harmankaya Castle, the most noble and powerful tekfur of Bithinya, and owner of the principality of Harmankaya.

Main characters

Osman Bey 

Osman (Burak Özçivit; seasons 1–4) is the third and youngest son of Ertuğrul Ghazi and Halime Hatun. He is also the younger brother of Gündüz Bey and Savcı Bey, and nephew of Selcan Hatun, whom he treats as his mother. He is the husband of Bala Hatun and Malhun Hatun and father of Orhan, Alaeddin Ali, Fatma Hatun and Halime Hatun. He aspires to follow his father Ertuğrul and his grandfather Süleyman Şah. He is attentive to his surroundings and good with a sword, like his father. He also disobeys his beys, like his father, choosing his own path. His weakness is his care for those close to him, making him prone to traps. He humiliates his enemies on the battlefield and while negotiating with them, stoking a thirst for revenge. He is elected Bey of the Kayı tribe in season 2. He decides to marry a second wife as per his father's will, and also changes the Kayı flag. Based on Osman I.

Bala Hatun 

Bala (Özge Törer; seasons 1-4) is the daughter of Şeyh Edebali and Ulduz Hatun, who died of a disease, the first wife of Osman Bey, and the sister-in-law of Dursun Fakih. She is the mother of Alaeddin Ali and Halime Hatun. She is the Chief Lady (Hanım/Baş Hatun) of the Kayi tribe and Yenişehir and the head of the Bacıyân-ı Rûm. She is a painter who is loyal to her father, her husband, the Ahi brotherhood, and Selcan Hatun. She was best friends with Gonca Hatun (deceased). She is calm and patient, but is prone to heartbreak. A Mongol stabbed her in season 1, leaving her infertile and the subject of teasing. In season 2, after her husband is elected bey, she becomes baş hatun of the Kayı tribe, succeeding Selcan Hatun. She is upset when Osman decides to marry a second wife, due to his late father's will, although she accepts her fate. She attempts to find him a wife, which leads to her meeting the kind and loving Aksu Hatun, whom Osman rejects because she isn't the daughter of a bey. Aksu is later killed by Targun Hatun, who loved Osman but seeks revenge on him after he exiles her for poisoning Bala. Targun regarded Bala as an obstacle preventing her marriage to Osman. After killing Targun, Bala had tensions with Malhun Hatun, who later becomes the second wife, although Bala accepts her. Bala later becomes pregnant and gives birth to Osman's second son Alaeddin Ali. Two months after the victory of İnegöl, she learns that she is expecting again and later gives birth to a daughter, Halime. She is always at the forefront of conquests and wars and is Osman bey's biggest support. Bala Hatun is the most powerful woman of the Kayi Obasi who continues to pledge her loyalty to her husband Osman at all times. Özge Törer won the Best Actress of the Year award at the Crystal Globe Awards for her performance. The character is based on Rabia Bala Hatun.

Malhun Hatun

Malhun Hatun (Yıldız Çağrı Atiksoy; Seasons 2-4), is the daughter of Ömer Bey, hanim of Bayindir tribe, the second wife of Osman Bey and the mother of Orhan and Fatma Hatun. She belongs to the Bayındır tribe, an Oğuz tribe settled in Ankara suffering persecution from Geyhatu. The tribe consists of 10,000 people and seeks to settle in Bithynia on Osman's invitation, which was one of the reasons why Malhun comes. She is skilled in archery and combat. She saved Osman bey from Nikola's trap. She has a noble lineage of Beys formerly loyal to the Selçuk State and Sultan Alaeddin Keykubat. In the beginning she has tense relations with Bala, while being arrogant due to her father's power. She is sent by her father to examine the western borders of the state. She discovers Dündar's ring in Söğüt, and attempts to find the traitors in the Kayı tribe herself. Osman then initiates a major battle with the Byzantines, with the support of Malhun Hatun which is historically known as the Battle of Domanic. She later marries Osman Bey in a political marriage, and becomes pregnant soon after. She is saved by Bala Hatun from Zoe's attempt to poison her and her child. She gives birth to Osman's first child Orhan. She administers Yenişehir trade. She is a brave hatun, supporting her husband Osman in battlefields and also accompanies him on his conquests. She is called Devlet Ana. Actress Yıldız Çağrı Atiksoy won Golden Palm Awards 2021 in the category of Best TV Series actress for her role as Malhun Hatun. Her character was the most anticipated character of Kurulus Osman and was based on Malhun Hatun.

Boran Alp 
Boran (starring seasons 1–4) is one of Osman Bey's main supporters and his best friend. He is the widower of Gonca Hatun and a close companion of Konur and later Göktuğ, Dumrul, Gence Bey and Cerkutay. He is a talented bard and singer. He uses a sword. He is skilled in archery, and often also uses a bow and arrow in close combat. He is devastated after the death of Gonca Hatun and takes his revenge by killing Julia. He allies with Konur Alp to support Osman Bey when Gunduz Bey took over Kayi Beylik.

Aliases:
Boran Bey

Dündar Bey 

Dündar (Ragıp Savaş; starring seasons 1–2) is the youngest son of Süleyman Şah and Hayme Hatun. He is the youngest brother of Sungurtekin Bey and Ertuğrul Ghazi and the youngest adoptive brother of Selcan Hatun. He is the husband of Hazal Hatun and the widower of Zöhre Hatun. Father of Aygül, Batur, and Bahadır, adoptive father of Saltuk Alp. Uncle of Osman Bey. Dundar is easily swayed by others. He was substitute bey while Ertuğrul Ghazi was on a mission in Konya. When the Mongols attacked, he preferred to bow down to them rather than fight, angering those who were close to Osman Bey. He is manipulated by his wives. He initially respects and is loyal to his older brother, Ertuğrul Ghazi. Loosely based on Dündar Bey

Savcı Bey 

Savcı (Kanbolat Görkem Arslan; starring season 2) is the second son of Ertuğrul Gazi and Halime Sultan, Gündüz Bey's younger brother and Osman Bey's older brother. Savcı is the husband of Lena Hatun and father of Bayhoca and a son named Ertuğrul. He is a scholarly, knowledgeable man and an 'alim. He has tense relations with Osman and is misled by his ambitious uncle Dündar, but he accepts Osman as the Bey and supports him. Based on Saru Batu Savcı Bey.

Aya Nikola
Nikola (Erkan Avcı; starring seasons 2–3) is one of the best commanders in the Byzantine Empire, much like Diriliş: Ertuğrul's Dragos. He is Komutan Fltyos and Helen best friend. He is an atheist, unlike his Christian counterparts. Nikola aspires to follow Julius Caesar's footsteps and is skilled in pottery and making sculptures. He doesn't let the Kayı tribe live a second with peace, starting with a plague to briefly occupying Kulucahisar twice. Nikola seeks to become Emperor. He seeks to start a big war with the Turkish tribes, with the help of the Templars, Geyhatu and the Cuman Turks.

Aliases:
Nikohlas
Tekfur Nikola/ Tekfur Aya Nikola
Imparator Nikola (self-proclaimed)

Turgut Bey
Turgut Bey (starring seasons 3–4) owns a tribe, in the beginning, has tensions with Osman Bey but choses to be on his side and help him in some of his missions. Falls in love with Mari, Tekfur Kosses's sister. He rescues her from force marriage with Nikola. He then rescues her again when she was kidnapped by Vizer Alemşah, he then marries her in Harmankaya. Mari is soon killed when she was pregnant by her closest friend Cornelia,but was killed later by Selcan Ana. He helps Osman Bey in conquests of castles. Inegöl was given under him. He had some clashes with Ahmed Bey son of Ali Bey, but were soon over. Years later after conquest of Yenişehir, he had now tensions with Bayindir Bey, he seeks on getting more castles and on one castle which he wanted was given to Öktem Bey by Osman Bey. So he separated his ways from him and became rude and started to support Valide Ismihan Sultan who just came to lands. But is angered when Sultan wanted him to make peace with Olof who is one of his enemy. Slowly he starts changing and helps Osman Bey again and he feels sorry for what he did before. Loosely based on Turgut Alp

Others
This is a list of main characters who starred in one season:

Season 1
Eren Vurdem as Konur Alp - One of Osman Bey's most trusted men and one of his main alps. Konur is very skilled in 1 to 1 battles with daggers. His tribe was raided by Mongols, causing his parents to have died and he and his younger brother Göktug to have separated. He is martyred by Göktug, his brother, who is manipulated by Balgay as Kongar for the second time. Loosely based on Konur Alp.
 as Prenses Sofia ( - The princess of Kulucahisar and Efendi Yannis's evil daughter as well as Kalanoz's lover. She cheats on her husband, Tekfur Yorgopolos, and then kills him. The Margarit Monks sought to make her the Empress of Byzantium. She appears to be a lovely princess at first but later reveals herself to be evil, cunning, and merciless. Her only aim is to take back the holy entrustment from Şeyh Edabali and help her father in his evil plans.
 as Efendi Yannis (disguised as a fortune-teller named Abdul and a Dervish) - Head of a secret Templar order called the 'Margarit Monks' who seek to kill all Turks and turn the Byzantine empire into a Catholic country again. He is the father of Princess Sofia.

Season 2
Tamer Yiğit as Ertuğrul Bey (also known as Ertuğrul Gazi) - The third son of Süleyman Şah and second biological son of Hayme Hatun, he is the brother of Sungurtekin Bey and Dündar Bey and adoptive brother of Selcan Hatun and Bamsı Beyrek. He is the widower of Halime Hatun, and the father of Gündüz Bey, Savcı Bey and Osman Bey. The long-serving Bey of the Kayı tribe. He is usually ill. A highly respected leader among the Turks. Based on Ertuğrul.

 as Geyhatu - The Viceroy (or Governor) of Anatolia under the İlhanlı (Ilkhanate). Grandson of Hulagu Han and great-great-grandson of Genghis Khan. He loves his son, Möngke, despite him wanting to kill him to become the Viceroy and then the İlhan (ruler) of the İlhanlı. He intended to marry Princess Adelfa to create an alliance between the İlhanlı and the Byzantine Empire. Based on Gaykhatu.

Season 3
Serhat Kilic as Tekfur Michael Kosses - Byzantine tekfur of Harmankaya, owner of its lands and principality, and a member of Palaiologos family. He is a relative of the Byzantine emperor and the most noble and powerful tekfur of Bithinya, a skilled fighter, a shrewd politician, and a skillful administrator. Loves his sister more than anything, and is devastated after Mari's death. He was a close ally of Tekfur Rogatus, Osman's most powerful ally and considers him his friend. With Osman and Edebali's guidance soon embraces Islam.
Taner Turan as Vizier Alamshah - Sultanate of Rûm vizier.
Murat Serezli as Üstad Arius (disguised as Ibrahim Fakih) - Head of a Templar secret organization who seek to destroy Turks and in particular Osman. He is the Master of Aya Nikola and Barkin Bey.
 as Barkin Bey - Betrothed of Selvi Hatun. After the death of Ömer Bey and his brother Ivaz Bey, he marries Selvi and becomes the new bey of Kizilbeyoglu tribe and Çavdar tribe united. He fights Osman's dream of founding a state. He is a loyal disciple of Ustad Arius.

Season 4
 as Kantakuzenos - Family member of the House of Kantakouzenos, claims to be the rightful heir to the throne of Emperor Andronikos II. When his attempt to overthrow the emperor failed, he allies himself with Olof, the leader of the imperial bodyguard, and plots numerous times against Osman. Is eventually executed by Osman Bey.
Nihat Altınkaya as Olof - The leader of the Varangian Guard. He initially travelled from the cold north along with his wife Frigg and his men to raid Osman Bey's land and later the Byzantines. Later, converts to christianity to the displeasure of Frigg. Captures the Inegöl Castle from Osman. Is beheaded by Osman after reconquest of Inegol in front of Nayman
İpek Karapınar as Frigg - A member of the Norsemen fighters and Olof's wife. Deadly and vicious towards her opponents. Starts spying on Osman and his people, disguised as Martha, a Christian tradeswoman, in Yenişehir. Eventually reveals herself to Osman Bey and Bala Hatun, when the duo were held in captivity by Olof and Kantakouzenos. Later, falls into a trap and is captured by Bala. Later Bala kills her after she tries to attack her sons 
Deniz Barut as Valide İsmihan Sultan - Mother of Sultan Alâeddin
Miray Akay as Alcieck Hatun The daughter of Oktem Bey and Bengi Hatun. Wants to join the Baciyans. In love with Aktemur Bey.
Berik Aitzhanov as Komutan Nayman - Senior Ilkhanid Commander who leads an Army of 40000 horsemen to raid Anatolia in response to killing of Mongol commander Samagar and an ambassador. Has a charismatic personality, pretty much like Dirilis Ertugrul's Baycu Noyan. Raids Osman's castles and other Turk Principalities wreaking havoc on Osman and his allies.

Supporting characters

Bamsı Beyrek

Bamsı (Nurettin Sönmez; starring season 1–2) was the adoptive brother and loyal alp of Ertuğrul Ghazi. He was the former Chief Alp of the Kayı tribe and the widower of Hafsa Hatun, father of Aslıhan (daughter of Bamsı) and Aybars Bey and adoptive father of Sıddık Alp. He was loving towards his wife and children and used to count the days since his daughter and wife died in a plague and then mourned for weeks after his son dies, mourning just as much for his adoptive son. He was a close friend and mentor of Osman Bey. Loosely based on Bamsi Beyrek, a character in the Book of Dede Korkut, whose story was referenced by Bamsı in season 3 of Diriliş: Ertuğrul.

Gündüz Bey

Gündüz Bey is the first and eldest son of Ertuğrul Gazi and Halime Sultan. Nephew of Selcan Hatun, who he treats as his own mother. Savcı Bey and Osman Bey's eldest brother. Husband of Ayşe Hatun, and the father Aktemur Bey and Aydoğdu Bey. He is protective and loving toward Osman Bey and Savcı Bey. Based on Gündüz Alp, the son of Ertuğrul.

Ayse Hatun
Ayşe Hatun is Gündüz Bey's wife. Knows how to calm her husband and is loyal to Selcan Hatun. Mother of Aktemur Bey and Aydoğdu Bey.

Aygül Hatun
Aygül (Buse Arslan) is the daughter of Dündar Bey and Zöhre Hatun and step-daughter of Hazal Hatun, the younger sister of Batur Bey and younger half-sister of Bahadır Bey. She is a paternal cousin of Osman Bey and niece of Selcan Hatun. She is the widow of Alişar Bey and the mother of Kayı Alp. She used to be in love with Osman Bey, and was jealous of Bala Hatun until Osman Bey supposedly kills her brother, Batur Bey. Later repented and became a great warrior female alp of osman. She married Cerkutay, and was later martyred.

Aliases:
Deli Aygül (nickname given by Cerkutay)

Gonca Hatun
Gonca Hatun is the deceased wife of Boran Alp, and the adoptive sister and best friend of Bala. A lady of the Ahis, serves and is loyal to her father figure, Şeyh Edebali. She treats Selcan Hatun as a mother, and is saddened when she temporarily has to leave the tribe. She was talented at fighting, along with her companions Bala and Aygül.

Sheikh Edebali
Şeyh Edebali (Seda Yıldız) is a Sufi Sheikh, Osman Bey's mentor and father-in-law. He is the son of Mahmut Derviş and widower of Ulduz Hatun. He is father of Bala Hatun and grandfather of Orhan, Alaeddin Ali, Halime and Fatma. A mentor to Osman. He is also both the father-in-law and teacher of Dursun Fakih. Based on Sheikh Edebali.

Abdurrahman Gazi

Abdurrahman Gazi (Celal Al) was a veteran warrior of the Kayı tribe. A former bodyguard of Osman Bey's grandparents, Süleyman Şah and Hayme Hatun, and an alp of Ertuğrul Gazi. A close friend of Osman Bey. A former chief alp of the Kayı tribe. One of his arms was amputated after he was wounded by Komutan Balgay. He is loyal to both Osman Bey and his father. Skilled in battle, and respected by everyone. He supports Osman in becoming the Bey. Based on Abdurrahman Gazi.

Göktuğ Alp 
Göktuğ or Göktug Alp (Burak Çelik; starring seasons 1–3) is one of Osman Bey's main alps. He was formerly Balgay's right-hand man and adoptive son, and Konur Alp's long-lost younger brother. Not to be confused with Diriliş: Ertuğrul Göktuğ.

Aliases:
Kongar (formerly)
Göktuğ Alpbaşı (formerly)

Cerkutay
Cerkutay (Çağrı Şensoy) is one of Balgay's former men. He laughs at everything. He has a tense relationship at times with Göktuğ, when serving both Balgay and later Osman. He likes to joke around, particularly with Boran Alp. He has a keen appetite for food and drink, often eating and drinking excessively. He is the Widower of Aygul Hatun, and the step father of Kayı Alp.

Selcan Hatun

Selcan Hatun (Didem Balçın; starring seasons 1–3) is the eldest daughter of Alptekin Bey and the adoptive daughter of Süleyman Şah and Hayme Hatun. She is the older sister of Gökçe Hatun and the adoptive sister of Sungurtekin Gazi, Ertuğrul Gazi and Dündar Bey. She is the widow of Gündoğdu Bey and the bereaved mother of Süleyman Alp and İltekin Bey. Selcan is treated as a mother by Gündüz and Osman after Halime Hatun's death, and by Bala, Aygül and Gonca after their mothers' deaths. She is protective of all the Kayı Hatuns, her nephews and nieces and is loyal to her adoptive brother, Ertuğrul Gazi. Loosely based on Princess Saljan, a character from the Book of Dede Korkut.

Aliases:
Selcan Ana

Kumral Abdal
Kumral Abdal (starring seasons 2–4) is a follower of Şeyh Edebali and flag bearer of Ertuğrul Gazi. He devotes himself to spreading Islam and fighting infidels.

Orhan
Orhan (starring seasons 3–4) is the son of Osman and his second wife Malhun Hatun. Elder brother of Alaeddin Ali, Halime Hatun and Fatma Hatun.

Alaeddin Ali
Alaeddin Ali (Yaman Çınar Balcı; starring seasons 3–4) is the son of Osman Bey and his first wife Bala Hatun. Younger brother of Orhan. Elder brother of Halime Hatun and Fatma Hatun.

Konur Alp
Sarkis/ Konur Alp (Berk Erçer; starring seasons 3–4) is a Seljuk commander who is the right-hand man of Vizier Alemshah. He has a scar on the left side of his face. Not be confused with 1 season Konur Alp. Based on Konur Alp

Aktemur Bey
Aktemur Bey (Baran Taha Özbek; starring seasons 3–4) is the elder son of Gündüz Bey and Ayşe Hatun. Elder brother of Aydoğdu Bey. Nephew of Osman Bey. Acts as a spy for Osman bey in Ïnegol. Falls in love with Alçiçek Hatun, daughter of Öktem Bey and Bengi Hatun. But soon backs off when he sees how easily she falls for others lies, despite numerous assurances on his behalf to fight for them.

Dursun Fakih
Dursun Fakih; starring seasons 3–4) is both the son-in-law and student of Sheikh Edebali. He is the brother-in-law of Bala Hatun and Osman Bey. He is most likely to lead the Friday sermon and prayer on behalf of Osman Bey.

Halime Hatun
Halime Hatun; (starring season 4) is the youngest child and daughter of Osman Bey and his first wife Bala Hatun. She is the younger sister of Orhan, Alaeddin Ali and Fatma Hatun. She is named in honour of her paternal grandmother, Halime Sultan.

Fatma Hatun
Fatma Hatun (Cemre Demircan); is the daughter of Osman Bey and his second wife Malhun Hatun. She is the younger sister of Orhan and Alaeddin Ali and the older sister of Halime Hatun.

Single season characters
This is a list of characters who were supporting characters in a single season, and may have made guest or minor appearances in other seasons:

Season 1
Saruhan Hünel as Alişar Bey - The husband of Aygül Hatun and the posthumous father of Kayı Alp. Alişar is the Selçuk Sançak Bey, an operative figure who deputies the Sultan and is the ruler/governor of the western portion of the Selçuk Sultanate of Rum. He is a puppet of the Mongols like most Selçuk operatives and leadership. Alişar is initially in love with Bala Hatun and Princess Sofia.
 Yurdaer Okur as Komutan Balgay - A Mongol commander who attacks the Kayı tribe. He envisions becoming the leader of the Mongols. He dislikes Geyhatu for his conversion to Buddhism.
Eren Hacısalihoğlu as Batur Bey - The son of Dündar Bey and Zöhre Hatun, step-son of Hazal Hatun. He is the elder half-brother of Bahadır Bey, and Aygül Hatun. Osman Bey's cousin. Not to be confused with Diriliş: Ertuğrul's Batur Alp.
 as Samsa Çavuş (also known as Samsa Bey) - A ruthless veteran soldier who runs part of the Kayı tribe. A close friend of Osman. He loves to battle and gets angry at those who do not stand with him. Not to be confused with Diriliş: Ertuğrul's Samsa Alp, although they are both based on the same historical figure, .
 as Zöhre Hatun (referred to as Zöhre Ana by Burçin Hatun) - Dündar Bey's second wife. She is the mother of Batur Bey and Aygül Hatun, step-mother of Bahadır Bey, and adoptive mother of Burçin Hatun. She is ambitious and abominates Osman Bey for overshadowing her family and seeks revenge on him.
 as Bahadır Bey - The son of Dündar Bey and Hazal Hatun, step-son of Zöhre Hatun. The older half-brother of Aygül Hatun and the younger half-brother of Batur Bey. Cousin of Osman Bey. Not to be confused with Diriliş: Ertuğrul's Bahadır Bey.
Latif Koru as Salvador/ Sıddık Alp (formerly Prens Salvador) - Was a Catalonian Prince and a member of the Catalan Company. He is Yannis's former servant.
Aslıhan Karalar as Burçin Hatun - Fiancé of Aybars. Zöhre Hatun's adoptive daughter. Best friend of Aygül. She dislikes Osman and blames him for Aybars' death.

Season 2
Yeşim Ceren Bozoğlu as Hazal Hatun - Dündar's first wife and Bahadır's mother, stepmother of Batur Bey and Aygül Hatun, Hanım of the Çobanoğulları tribe, granddaughter of Hüsamettin Çoban and sister of Muzaffereddin Yavlak Arslan. She wears luxurious purple clothes and expensive jewelry. Hazal is arrogant as she is the sister of an influential and wealthy bey.

 as Yavlak Arslan (also known as Muzaffereddin Yavlak Hasan and Arslan Bey) - Hazal Hatun's older brother, Dündar's brother-in-law, and Bahadır Bey's uncle. Bey of the Çobanoğulları, a small, poor but powerful tribe close to the Mongols during Argun's rule. Formerly a rebellious protégé of Ertuğrul. He is the Uç Bey of Kastamonu. Based on Muzaffer al-Din Yavlak Arslan, the third bey of the Chobanids, an Anatolian beylik.
Seray Kaya as Lena Hatun (formerly Prensesi Lena) - Savcı Bey's wife and the daughter of a Byzantine Tekfur. She is the mother of Bayhoca and another son named Ertuğrul. Loosely based on Avna Hatun, the wife of Saru Batu Savcı Bey.
Yağızkan Dikmen as Bayhoca - The first son of Savcı Bey and Lena Hatun. Osman Bey's nephew. Spent years studying in Crimea. Admires his uncle, Osman, and aspires to be like him, having a thirst for battle. However, due to his young age, he is naive and makes bad decisions, sometimes endangering himself and others. Based on Bayhoca.
Zeynep Tuğçe Bayat as Targun Hatun - The daughter of İnal Bey who was sent to the Kayı tribe by Aya Nikola to spy, in exchange for Nikola releasing her father from captivity. She is from a distant Cuman Turk tribe, which just like the Oǧuz Turks is of Turkic ethnicity, however, is Tengrist rather than Muslim.
Seçkin Özdemir as Komutan Flatyos - A disgraced Byzantine commander and an old friend of Aya Nikola, much like Diriliş: Ertuğrul's Uranos and Titan. He has a grudge against Ertuğrul and his sons, as Ertuğrul killed his father, presumably Komutan Kostas, when he was conquering Karacahisar. Has an unrequited love for Lena. He also holds a grudge against Savcı for marrying her. 
Şahin Ergüney as Ömer/Umur Bey - The Bey of the Bayındır tribe. Son of Kızıl Bey and father of Malhun Hatun. A war veteran formerly loyal to the Seljuks, famed for battles against the Mongols. Based on Ömer Bey, the possible father of Malhun Hatun.
 as Petrus (disguised as Süleyman) - A member of the Knights Templar organisation. Sent by the Pope for a secret plan. Not to be confused with Diriliş: Ertuğrul's Petrus.
Teoman Kumbaracıbaşı as Kara Şaman Togay - The son of Baycu Noyan, raised by a Shaman after Noyan's death. Has two unknown brothers who serve him. A fierce commander and 'hunting dog' of Geyhatu. 
 as Epharistos Kalanoz - The younger brother of Komutan Kalanoz. Based on Kalanoz, a commander of Aya Nikola.
 as Komutam Camuha - A Mongol commander sent by Geyhatu to help Kara Shaman Togay collect taxes from tribes. 
Murat Boncuk as Aykut Alp - An Alp of Osman Bey.
 Yusuf Korkmaz as Salguraga Alp - A loyal alp of Osman who appeared in end of season 2 and helps him at the hardest times. Is known as a lone bear of konya

Season 3
 as Tekfur Rogatus Laskaris - Tekfur of Bilecik Castle and a member of Laskaris family and is the nephew of the Emperor Andronicus II. He owns the principality and lands of Bilecik (Bilecik and Harmankaya principalities are for the royal family members only). He is the best friend of tekfur Kosses.
Serdar Akülker as Anselmo - Leader of a group of Catalans who serve only for money. 
Seyma Korkmaz as Princess Mari - She is the sister of Kosses and she married Turgut.
Melis Gürhan as Cornelia - The assistant of Mari. 
Serdar Kayaokay as Papaz Gregor - A Byzantine priest who carries an important Christian object. 
Yazmeen Baker as Julia - An evil Christian warrior woman who was brought by Tekfur Rogatus in Anatolia with her personnel named "The Angels of Death" to serve him. 
Sibel Aytan as Zehra Hatun - A close friend and companion of Bala Hatun who appears shortly after Gonca Hatun's death.
Batuhan Bozkurt Yüzgüleç as Akça Koca/ Çoban - A simple shepherd near Inegöl. When Osman suddenly appears, he joines him. Orphaned, he grew up under the care of an Armenian carpenter. He has cartographic skills and a great ingenuity about weaponry. Later he becomes a journeyman with the Ahi brotherhood of Sheikh Edebali. Loosely based on 
Sacit Süer as Ferman - A soldier who is one of Alemshahs closest men. 
 as Selvi Hatun - Barkin's wife, Ivaz Bey's daughter and paternal cousin of Malhun, who holds deep hatred for her. Later repented.
Serkan Tastemur as Hüsameddin Alp - An Alp of Barkin Bey.
Barış Yalçınsoy as Isaac Alp or Komutan Isaac - An apprentice of Master Arius and his favorite student who poses to Akca dervish. Returns in 116 ( Sezon 4 ) as a Shaman of Komutan Nayman and as a converted spy of Turgut Bey
 as Ali Bey 
Engincan Tura as Mustafa Bey - A Young son of Ali Bey and an apprentice of Atabey Ahmet. 
 as Komutan Romanos - A deadly commander from Constantinople who intends to destroy Osman.
Levent Özdilek as Tekfur Basileus - Tekfur of Yarhisar Castle. Step-father of Holofira.
Duru Yazıcı as Holofira - Step-daughter of Tekfur Basileus. Based on Holofira
 as Komutan Cebe. A fierce Mongol commander who allied with Romanos and Barkin to defeat Osman and create havoc between him and Ali Bey.

Season 4
 as Bayindir Bey - The bey of Çavuldur tribe. He has a charismatic and heavy character. Only sides with Osman due to wealth gain.
Kaan Yalçin as Öktem Bey the Kargi's tribe Bey. Alçiçek's father and Bengi's husband and aveteran commander. He has a strong character and loves his family. Is beheaded and thus martyred by Nayman in front of his family.
Begum Cagla Taskin as Ülgen Hatun - A chief who is well known for her cooking. Has a really good and teasing personality attracting Cerkutay Bey.
Almila Uluer Atabeyoğlu as Bengi Hatun. Öktem Beys wife and Alçiçek's mother. She has a rude, combative, and possessive character. Dislikes Kayis especially Aktemur and Ayşe.

Minor characters

Multiple seasons 
  Cahit Ozturk as Saruja Alp - He was a normal Alp until he was promoted to a higher level in the same season and later disappeared. Re appears in season 4 which left people perplexed. He is martyred by Ismihan Sultan.
  Samet Aksoy as Oguz Alp - An Alp of Osman from season 1 like Boran and Ayaz. He now appears as a main alp.

  Ozgu Rakar as Ayez Alp - Alp Of osman from sezon 1

  Tugrul Kizildemir as Kutlu Alp - Alp Of Ayse Hatun and previously a normal soldier of Osman who used to not show himself
 Ömer Ağan as Saltuk Alp - Adoptive son of Dündar Bey and Hazal Hatun, bodyguard and alp of Dündar. Based on Saltuk Alp, an early Ottoman warrior.
Tolga Akkaya as Dumrul Alp- Osman Bey's alp. Works usually with Ayaz Alp. Not to be confused with Diriliş: Ertuğrul's Dumrul Alp. 
 as Ayaz Alp - Osman Bey's alp. Works usually with Dumrul Alp. He is the oldest of Osman's alps and loves eating. Uses an axe in one hand and a sword in the other.
Fatih Ayhan as Baysungur Alp - The bodyguard of Ertuğrul Bey and Savcı Bey. Supports Savcı in his attempt to become the Bey. Based on Baysungur Alp, the alp (warrior) of Ertuğrul and Osman. 
Ayşen Gürler as Helen - The assistant of Sofia and later Nikola. Serves as Sofia's closest assistant and best friend.
Ahmet Kılıç as Zülfikar Derviş- A dervish of Şeyh Edebali. 
 as Akça Derviş - A close friend of Şeyh Edebali, and one of his dervishes. Not to be confused with Diriliş: Ertuğrul's Akça Bey.
 as Demirci Davud (also known as Davut Bey) - A close companion of Osman and Ertuğrul and the Kayı blacksmith, He is mostly seen around with Çömlekçi İdris. He is brave and loyal to Osman Bey.
Rasid Baran as Raşit Alp - A devoted alp of Umur Bey from Kizil Bey tribe who is also an alp of Malhun Hatun.
Burak Yenilmez as Kutan Alp - Personal alp of Turgut Bey
Zabit Samedov as Gence Alp - An Azerbaijani Turk warrior from Karabakh
Turpal Tokaev as Turahan Alp - An Alp from Karabakh who came in search of Osman
Sener Savas as Sultan Mesud II - Ruler of the Sultanate of Rum
 as Imparator Andronikos II - Emperor of Byzantine Empire
 Ismail Alan as Ayvaz Alp - An Alp of Osman from season 2. Appears more often with Dumrel, Oguz and Ayaz
 Hakan Oncu As Dumrel Alp - an Alp of Osman from season 2. Appears more often

Season 1 

Abdül Süsler as Komutan Kalanoz- He is commander of Kulucahisar and Sofia's lover. He thought that he had to kill Yorgopolos in order to marry Sofia, he didn't know that it was a plan of the Margarit Monks. Not to be confused with his younger brother Epharistos Kalanoz.
Kadir Terzi as Kanturali Alp - An alp of Osman Bey. Is martyred during Osman's escape from Salvador. Not to be confused with Diriliş: Ertuğrul's Turalı Alp. Loosely based on Kan Turali, a character from the Book of Dede Korkut.

Season 2 
 as David (disguised as Çömlekçi İdris)- A Templar spy working for the devious Efendi Petrus for years. Disguised as a cowardly Kayı potter who decided to migrate to Arslan's tribe when his tribe was in a bad situation. He replaces Şahin Bey as tribe council bey and is seen around with Demirci Davud.
Sezanur Sözer as Eftalya - Daughter of Arito Üsta. The maid of Aya Nikola.
Kahraman Sivri as Arito Üsta - The father of Eftalya. He is deaf, but an expert lip-reader. As Nikola's cook, he spies for the Kayıs along with his daughter, helping them in their attacks on Nikola's forces.
 Oğuz Kara as Ahmet Alp - A little boy who lost his father to Tefkur Alexis, much like Dirilis: Ertugrul's Turali. Bala and Osman treat him as their own son. Not to be confused with Diriliş: Ertuğrul's Ahmet Alp (formerly Ares). Based on Ahmet Gazi, one of Orhan Gazi's alps.
Çağlar Yalçınkaya as Sartaç Alp - The alp and bodyguard of Yavlak Arslan.
Cüneyt Arkın as the head of the White-Bearded Men - This leader is said to be the most developed Aksakal head out of both Kuruluş: Osman and Diriliş: Ertuğrul. He is a close companion of Ertuğrul and later Osman.
Tekin Temel as Simon (disguised as Melik) - The right-hand man of Petrus, posing as a wealthy merchant, "Tüccar Melik Abdullah".
Semih igdigul as Governor Yargucu - Commander of Geyhatu and de facto ruler of Seljuk in Geyhatu's absence to become the Khan.

Season 3 
Ridvan Uludaşdemir as Diego - A Catalan warrior and right-hand man of Anselmo.
Hamza Güneysu as Serhan Alp - Alp of Turgut Bey
Devlet Yagshymuradov as Balaban Alp - A normal selcuk soldier who joins Osman and becomes his alp as he comes with a messenger of Sultan Alaeddin.
Jaffa Dz as Shamil Alp - A young alp who arrived with Gence bey to assist and support Osman towards his goal for a future state. His loyalty and bravery makes him one of Osman's most trusted Alps.

Guest characters 

This is a list of notable characters who have been guests in the series, meaning that they influenced the plot or the main characters in some episodes or were the main characters in those episodes:

Serdar Gökhan as Süleyman Şah - The father of Ertuğrul Gazi, Gündoğdu Bey, Sungurtekin Bey and Dündar Bey. Adoptive father of Selcan Hatun, Turgut Bey and Bamsi Beyrek. The husband of Hayme Hatun and grandfather of Osman Bey, as well as his brothers and cousins. Legendary former long-serving Bey of Kayı tribe. He only appears in Osman Bey's dreams. Based on Suleyman Shah.

 as Sungurtekin Bey (works as a spy under the name, Hristo)- The second son of Süleyman Şah and eldest son of Hayme Hatun. The elder brother of Ertuğrul Gazi and Dündar Bey, younger half-brother of Gündoğdu Bey. Osman Bey's uncle. Has a son and a daughter with an unknown wife. Rumors say he will return in season 4.

 as Aksu Hatun - A hatun who lives in Söğüt with her unknown mother. 
Murat Ercanlı as İnal Bey - Targun's father and the Bey of a Cuman Turk tribe. He is reasonable, having his daughter marry a Muslim when she is a Tengrist and also not letting her ally against a Turk.
 as Komutan Böke - One of the commanders of Mongolian Viceroy Geyhatu.
Serkan Tatar as Pehlivan Alp/Derviş - A close friend of Şeyh Edebali, and one of his dervishes.
 as Aybars Bey - Son of Bamsı Bey and Hafsa Hatun. The younger brother of Aslıhan Hatun. Close companion and adoptive cousin of Osman.
Yaşar Aydınlıoğlu as Tekfur Yorgopolos - Tekfur of Kulucahisar Castle. Seeks to rid his castle of traitors with the help of Osman. He wants peace with the Turks.
  as Tekfur Alexis - A tekfur of İnegöl castle. He wanted to rid the lands of all Turks for conquering Kulucahisar castle. Not to be confused with season 1's Alexis.
Hazal Adıyaman as Prensesi Adelfa- Niece of the Byzantine Emperor Michael VIII. Was to be the Hetaera of Mongol Han (Viceroy at the time), Geyhatu, thus creating an alliance between the Byzantines and the Mongols.
 as the head of the White-Bearded Men in season 1.
Elif Cansu Akbiyik as Princess Adelfa's servant - The Byzantines took her disguised as Princess Adelfa to deflect anyone who would attempt to save her.
Arslanbek Sultanbekov as the singer at Osman and Bala's wedding who performed the song "Osman Bey".
Hakan Ummak as  - Is the son of Ulu Bey who comes from Germiyanids lands in order to fight wars alongside Osman Bey. Is a talented blacksmith as well as skillful at swords and archery. 
Hazal Benli as  - Is a fruit seller at Soğut.
Süreyya Gürsel Evren as Ivaz Bey - The bey of the Çavdar tribe. Umur Bey's brother, Malhun Hatun's uncle, Selvi Hatun's father, Father-In-Law Barkın Bey. 
Ferhat Yilmaz as Güngor Bey - A Germiyanids tribe's bey. Allies with vizier Alamshah against Mongols and Osman.

Cast table 
This is an overview of the cast. Some characters, who made little appearance, mainly minor or guest characters, are not included but are mentioned in the articles for each season. Supporting characters and minor characters (if mentioned) are classed as recurring characters.

Notes

| Ozgu Rakar
| Ayaz Alp
| 1
| TBD
| Samet Aksoy
| Oguz Alp
| 1
| TBD
| Cahit Ozturk
| Sarija Alp
| 1
| 106
| Tugrul Kizildemir
| Kutlu Alp
|60
|TBD

Casting

Malhun Hatun
The series was initially named Diriliş: Osman. Aslıhan Karalar, the actress who played Burçin Hatun, was imagined to play the role of Malhun Hatun, who did not appear in the first season. According to history sources Rabia Bala was Malhun Hatun, the same person. Aslıhan Karalar was the first actress confirmed to join the series. However, in series, Osman's first partner is Bala hatun who was played by Turkish actress Özge Törer. This was only verified after the series' first episode. Before season 2, Özge Yağız and Yağmur Öztürk were expected to play the role of Malhun Hatun due to the fact that they both shared videos of them taking fencing lessons. This thought was dropped after Özge Yağız took part in the TV series  and Yağmur Öztürk took part in the TV series . Yağmur Öztürk was still, however, rumoured to play the role at some point. The 43rd episode trailer then revealed that  was likely to play this role, however, it turned out that she would portray Aksu Hatun. It was later confirmed that Yıldız Çağrı Atiksoy would play the part.

Ertuğrul Gazi
Mehmet Bozdağ said there will be a surprise about this character in Kuruluş: Osman while Engin Altan Düzyatan, who plays Ertuğrul in Diriliş: Ertuğrul, said that he may give a surprise, but "no clear decision can be made". He may later appear in some dreams (like Süleyman Şah) or in a flashback. Ertuğrul was at first thought to appear in season 1. When he didn't appear, he was thought to be played by Engin Altan and appear in season 2. Other rumours indicated that Ediz Hun would play his role. The character's appearance was When the first trailer was released, it was confirmed that Tamer Yiğit would portray Ertuğrul.

See also
 List of Diriliş: Ertuğrul characters
 List of Kuruluş: Osman episodes
 List of awards and nominations received by Kuruluş: Osman

Notes

References

External links 
 List of Kuruluş: Osman characters on IMDb
 List of Kurulus Osman English Subtitles on Osman Online

2019 Turkish television series debuts
 
Diriliş: Ertuğrul and Kuruluş: Osman
Lists of television characters
Lists of Turkish drama television series characters
Television series about Islam
Television series about the Ottoman Empire
Television series set in the 13th century